WAJL is a Southern Gospel and Bluegrass formatted broadcast radio station licensed to South Boston, Virginia, serving South Boston and Halifax County, Virginia.  WAJL is owned and operated by Linda Waller Barton.

References

External links
 The Beacon 1400AM Online

2010 establishments in Virginia
Southern Gospel radio stations in the United States
Radio stations established in 2010
AJL